The Bob Newhart Show is an American comedy variety show starring comedian Bob Newhart. It originally ran from October 1961 through June 1962 on NBC, airing on Wednesday nights at 10 p.m. Eastern time, immediately following Perry Como's Kraft Music Hall. The variety show was sponsored by Kraft Foods's Sealtest Dairy division.

The show was awarded the Primetime Emmy Award for Outstanding Program Achievement in the Field of Humor (now known as the Emmy for Outstanding Comedy Series) in 1962. It was also nominated for the Writing Achievement in Comedy Award for Roland Kibbee, Bob Newhart, Don Hinkley, Milt Rosen, Ernest Chambers, Dean Hargrove, Robert Kaufman, Norm Liebmann, Charles Sherman, Howard Snyder and Larry Siegel, but they lost to Carl Reiner for The Dick Van Dyke Show. The show also won a Peabody Award in 1961.

References

External links

1961 American television series debuts
1962 American television series endings
1960s American comedy television series
1960s American variety television series
English-language television shows
NBC original programming
Peabody Award-winning television programs
Primetime Emmy Award for Outstanding Comedy Series winners
Television shows filmed in New York City